HMS Princess was a 44-gun fourth-rate frigate of the English Royal Navy, built at Lydney and launched in August 1660. By 1666 her armament had been increased to 52 guns.

Princess was broken up in November 1680.

Notes

References

Lavery, Brian (2003) The Ship of the Line - Volume 1: The development of the battlefleet 1650-1850. Conway Maritime Press. .
Winfield, Rif (2009) British Warships in the Age of Sail 1603-1714: Design, Construction, Careers and Fates. Seaforth Publishing, 

Ships of the line of the Royal Navy
1660s ships
Ships built in Lydney